Raymond Forrest Lewis (November 5, 1899 – June 2, 1977) was an American actor of the theater, radio, motion pictures and television.

Early years
Lewis was born in Knightstown, Indiana, the son of Joseph Saint Lewis and Myla Leota Lewis and attended Indiana University for a year. On August 23, 1917, he married Elsa Grace Cross in Knightstown. They had a son, Forrest Gallion Lewis, and eventually divorced.

Stage 
Lewis acted in repertory theater and then on Broadway with Lenore Ulric in Lulu Belle. He also acted in touring productions, including Broken Dishes (1930).

Radio
Lewis's roles on radio programs included those shown in the table below.

Also in radio (1948–1950) he had parts in the anthology Destination Freedom, a series written by Richard Durham, dedicated to the retelling the lives of notable Negros in the Americas.

Lewis was in the supporting cast of Family Skeleton  and The Roy Rogers Show.

Television
Lewis played Peavey in the syndicated television version of The Great Gildersleeve (1954–1955) and Mr. Mack, the host on the ABC children's series Sandy Strong (1952).

In the mid-1950s, he appeared as a deputy in the syndicated crime drama Sheriff of Cochise and its successor series, U.S. Marshal, both starring John Bromfield. He guest starred with Maudie Prickett in the episode "Brief Glory" of the syndicated western series 26 Men, starring Tris Coffin. He appeared on a wide array of programs, ranging from the CBS western series My Friend Flicka, set on a Wyoming ranch, to the NBC sitcom, The People's Choice, with Jackie Cooper, to the  ABC's western drama, The Man from Blackhawk, starring Robert Rockwell. He also appeared on the NBC western series, Riverboat, starring Darren McGavin, and on the ABC sitcom, Harrigan and Son, starring Pat O'Brien, and the ABC drama series about the Roman Catholic priesthood, Going My Way. In 1957 Lewis appeared as Charlie Miller in the TV western Cheyenne in the episode titled "Land Beyond the Law."

Lewis was cast as the recurring character, Colby, in the 1961–1962 CBS sitcom Ichabod and Me with Robert Sterling, George Chandler, Reta Shaw, and Burt Mustin. Lewis also guest starred in the ABC/Warner Brothers western series, Colt .45 with Wayde Preston, on the syndicated western Mackenzie's Raiders, starring Richard Carlson, on the CBS hit comedy, The Andy Griffith Show, and on the ABC sitcom, The Real McCoys, starring Walter Brennan.

Partial filmography

 Gildersleeve on Broadway (1943) – Druggist Carson (uncredited)
 I'll Tell the World (1945) – Joe Sunshine (uncredited)
 Week-End with Father (1951) – Clarence Willett
 Has Anybody Seen My Gal? (1952) – Martin Quinn
 It Grows on Trees (1952) – Dr. Burrows
 The Lawless Breed (1953) – Zeke Jenkins
 The Clown (1953) – Mr. Huston, the Pawnbroker (uncredited)
 Francis Covers the Big Town (1953) – Judge Stanley
 Take Me To Town (1953) – Ed Higgins, Storekeeper
 The Stand at Apache River (1953) – Deadhorse
 Gun Fury (1953) – Weatherby
 Escape from Fort Bravo (1953) – Dr. Miller (uncredited)
 Dial Red O (1955) – Captain (uncredited)
 Cell 2455, Death Row (1955) – Parole Officer (uncredited)
 Apache Ambush (1955) – Sheriff Silas Parker
 All That Heaven Allows (1955) – Mr. Weeks
 The Spoilers (1955) – Banty Jones
 Man in the Shadow (1957) – Jake Kelley, the coroner
 The Sheepman (1958) – Mr. Baker – Tack Shop Proprietor (uncredited)
 The Thing That Couldn't Die (1958) – Julian Ash
 The Shaggy Dog (1959) – Officer Kelly
 The Monster of Piedras Blancas (1959) – Constable George Matson
 Posse from Hell (1961) – Doctor Welles
 The Absent-Minded Professor (1961) – Police Officer Kelley
 Son of Flubber (1963) – Police Officer Kelly
 Tammy and the Doctor (1963) – Dr. Crandall
 Man's Favorite Sport? (1964) – Skaggs
 The Dick Van Dyke Show (1965) – Mr. Harlow, Numismatist
 Red Line 7000 (1965) – Jenkins (uncredited)
 Out of Sight (1966) – Mr. Carter
 Riot on Sunset Strip (1967) – Aynsley
 Skin Game (1971) – Peter (uncredited)
 The Todd Killings (1971) – Mr. Robinson

References

External links
 

1899 births
1977 deaths
Male actors from Indiana
American radio actors
American male film actors
American male television actors
Male actors from Greater Los Angeles
People from Knightstown, Indiana
20th-century American male actors
Male Western (genre) film actors
Western (genre) television actors